Ilse Aichinger (1 November 1921 – 11 November 2016) was an Austrian writer known for her accounts of her persecution by the Nazis because of her Jewish ancestry. She wrote poems, short stories and radio plays, and won multiple European literary prizes.

Early life 
Aichinger was born in 1921 in Vienna, along with her twin sister, to Berta, a doctor of Jewish ethnicity, and Ludwig, a teacher. As her mother's family was assimilated, the children were raised Catholic. Aichinger spent her childhood in Linz and, after her parents divorced, she moved to Vienna with her mother and sister, attending a Catholic secondary school. After the Anschluss in 1938, her family was subjected to Nazi persecution. As a "half-Jew" she was not allowed to continue her studies and became a slave labourer in a button factory. Her sister Helga escaped from Nazism in July 1939 through a Kindertransport to England where she eventually gave birth to a daughter, who became English artist Ruth Rix. During World War II, Aichinger was able to hide her mother in her assigned room, in front of the Hotel Metropol, the Viennese Gestapo headquarters. But many relatives from her mother's side, among them her grandmother Gisela, of whom she was particularly fond, were sent to the Maly Trostenets extermination camp near Minsk, and murdered.

Career 
In 1945, Aichinger began to study medicine at the University of Vienna, while writing in her spare time. In her first publication,  (The Fourth Gate), she wrote about her experience under Nazism. In 1947 she and her mother Berta were able to travel to London and visit Aichinger's twin Helga and her daughter Ruth. The visit was the inspiration for a short story, "Dover".

She gave up her studies in 1948 in order to finish her novel,  ("The greater hope", translated as Herod's Children). The book went on to become one of the top German-language novels of the twentieth century. It is a surrealist account of a child's persecution by the Nazis in Vienna.

In 1949, Aichinger wrote the short story "Spiegelgeschichte". It was published in four parts in an Austrian newspaper, and is well known in Austria because it is part of the set of books taught in schools. The story is written backwards, beginning with the end of the biography of the unnamed woman, and ending with her early childhood.

In 1949, Aichinger became a reader for publishing houses in Vienna and Frankfurt, and worked with Inge Scholl to found an Institute of Creative Writing in Ulm, Germany.

In 1951, Aichinger was invited to join the writers' group Gruppe 47, a group which aimed to spread democratic ideas in post-war Austria. She read her story "Spiegelgeschichte" aloud at a meeting of the group, and leading group members such as Hans Werner Richter were impressed with the unusual narrative construction. The following year, she won the group's prize for best text, becoming the first female recipient. In 1956, she joined the Academy of Arts, Berlin. She was also a guest lecturer at the German Institute at the University of Vienna, teaching on literature and psychoanalysis.

Reviewing a 1957 volume of her short works in translation, The Bound Man and Other Stories, Anthony Boucher describes Aichinger as "a sort of concise Kafka," praising the title story, "" ("The Bound Man"), for its "narrative use of multi-valued symbolism", The similarity to Kafka's work has been frequently commented on, however other critics state that Aichinger's work goes beyond Kafka's in her emphasis on the emotional side of human suffering.

After the death of her husband, the German poet Günter Eich, in 1972, Aichinger and others edited his works and published them as Collected Works of Gunter Eich. In 1996, at the age of 75, she was the host of a German radio series Studio LCB for the Literary Colloquium Berlin.

Aichinger died on 11 November 2016, aged 95.

Personal life 
Aichinger met the poet and radio play author Günter Eich through the Group 47 and they were married in 1953; they had a son  (1954–1998), and in 1958 a daughter, Mirjam.

Awards
Group 47 Literature Prize (1952)
Immermann-Preis (1955)
 (1957)
Großer Literaturpreis der Bayerischen Akademie der Schönen Künste (1961, 1991)
Anton Wildgans Prize (1968)
Nelly Sachs Prize (1971)
Roswitha Prize (1975)
Petrarca-Preis (1982)
Europalia Literature Prize (1987)
Grand Austrian State Prize (1995)
Austrian State Prize for European Literature (1996)
, co-recipient with W. G. Sebald and Markus Werner (2000)

Works 

1945: Das vierte Tor (The Fourth Gate), essay
1948: Die größere Hoffnung (The Greater Hope), novel, adapted to a stage play in 2015
1949: "Spiegelgeschichte", short story
1951: Rede unter dem Galgen (Speech under the Gallows), short stories
1953: Der Gefesselte (The Bound Man), short stories
1953: Knöpfe (Buttons), radio play, adapted to stage play in 1957
1954: Plätze und Strassen (Squares and streets), short stories
1957: Zu keiner Stunde. Szenen und Dialoge (Not at Any Time. Scenes and dialogues), radio plays, dramatised in 1996 at the Volkstheater, Vienna
1963: Wo ich wohne (Where I Live), short stories
1965: Eliza, Eliza, short stories
1968: Meine Sprache und ich, short stories
1969: Auckland, radio plays
1970: Nachricht vom Tag (News of the Day), short stories
1973: Zweifel an Balkonen (Doubts about Balconies), short story
1974: Gare maritime, radio play
1976: Schlechte Wörter (Inferior Words), short stories; 
1978: Verschenkter Rat, poems
1996: Kleist, Moos, Fasane, collection of short works
2001: Film und Verhängnis. Blitzlichter auf ein Leben (Film and fate. Flashlights on a life), autobiography
2005: Unglaubwürdige Reisen, short stories
2006: Subtexte, essay

Translations 

 The Bound Man and Other Stories. Translated by Eric Mosbacher. Secker & Warburg, London 1955
 Herod's Children. Translated by Cornelia Schaeffer. Atheneum, New York 1963
 Selected Stories and Dialogs. Ed. by James C. Alldridge. Pergamon Press, Oxford, New York 1966
 Selected Poetry and Prose. Ed. and translated by Allen H. Chappel. With an introduction by Lawrence L. Langer. Logbridge-Rhodes, Durango, Colorado 1983
 The Greater Hope. Translated by Geoff Wilkes. Königshausen & Neumann, Würzburg 2016
 Bad Words. Selected Short Prose. Translated by Uljana Wolf and Christian Hawkey. Seagull Books, London / New York / Kalkutta 2019
Squandered Advice. Translated by Steph Morris. Seagull Books, 2022

References

Further reading 
 A Spatial Reading of Ilse Aichinger's Novel Die größere Hoffnung by Gail Wiltshire, Königshausen & Neumann, Würzburg 2015

External links
 
 "Aichinger, Ilse" International Who's Who. Accessed September 1, 2006. 
 
Aichinger, Ilse: "Spiegelgeschichte", in: Der Gefesselte, Frankfurt am Main: Fischer, 1953. (worldcat-link)

1921 births
2016 deaths
Austrian people of Jewish descent
Writers from Vienna
Austrian women poets
Anton Wildgans Prize winners
Austrian women writers
Members of the Academy of Arts, Berlin
Members of the German Academy for Language and Literature
Holocaust survivors
Jewish Austrian writers
Jewish women writers
University of Vienna alumni